In December 1885 the Elections and Qualifications Committee overturned the 1885 general election for Young, in which Gerald Spring and William Watson had been declared elected, with William Watson having a margin of 2 votes over James Mackinnon.

The petition made 2 main complaints (1) the returning officer at Bendick Murrell had marked the ballot papers with the electoral number of the voter, allowing anyone to ascertain how each elector had voted and (2) votes for Mackinnon were improperly rejected as informal. The members of the committee were Robert Smith (Chairman), John Burns, Henry Clarke, John Purves, George Reid, Septimus Stephen and John Sutherland.

The Elections and Qualifications Committee declared that William Watson had not been elected the member for Young, however no by-election was conducted. Instead the committee declared that James Mackinnon had been elected with a margin of 48 votes. No reasons were published.

Dates

Result

The Elections and Qualifications Committee overturned the 1885 general election for Young.

See also
Electoral results for the district of Young
List of New South Wales state by-elections

References

1885 elections in Australia
New South Wales state by-elections
1880s in New South Wales